Full Frontal is a 2002 American comedy-drama film by Steven Soderbergh about a day in the life of a handful of characters in Hollywood. It stars Catherine Keener, Blair Underwood, David Duchovny, Julia Roberts, Mary McCormack, Nicky Katt, Brad Pitt, and David Hyde Pierce. The film was shot on digital video using the Canon XL-1s in under a month. The film blurs the line between what is real and what is fiction in its depiction of a film within a film (and possibly within another).

Cast

Production
The film was announced in 2001 and Catherine Keener was the first actor attached to the project, named How to Survive a Hotel Room Fire. It was billed by Miramax as "an unofficial sequel of sorts" to Sex, Lies, and Videotape. In October, Julia Roberts, David Hyde Pierce, and David Duchovny were announced as leads in the project, and after the September 11 attacks, the film title was changed to The Art of Negotiating a Turn.

After a phone call with Harvey Weinstein because he did not like the new movie title, Soderbergh suggested the title Full Frontal. Production on the film began on November 6, 2001.

The character named Harvey (played by Jeff Garlin) is a reference to Weinstein himself.

Release

Box office 

Full Frontal had a limited release in the United States on August 2, 2002, opening in 208 theaters, and earning $739,834 its first weekend. The film was released in the United Kingdom on May 23, 2003, and failed to reach the Top 10.

Critical response

Review aggregation website Rotten Tomatoes gives the film a score of 39% based on reviews from 145 critics. The site's consensus reads: "An  confusing movie made worse by the poor camera work."

Writing for the Chicago Sun-Times, Roger Ebert called Full Frontal "a film so amateurish that only the professionalism of some of the actors makes it watchable". Kenneth Turan of the Los Angeles Times wrote, "When a set of pre-shooting guidelines a director came up with for his actors turns out to be cleverer, better written and of considerable more interest than the finished film, that's a bad sign. A very bad sign."

Other critics praised Soderbergh for his experimental approach. Ann Hornaday of The Washington Post gave an overall positive review, but wrote, "Full Frontal is a movie about people making movies about movies, and Soderbergh edits so quickly and effortlessly between those layers of reality that a concentrically ordered universe similar to nesting Russian dolls quickly begins to feel more like a hall of mirrors. Watching Full Frontal is a vertiginous, disorienting experience, one that reflects its characters with grotesque, funny and sometimes horrifying exaggeration. No matter how much fun it is to watch – and for hard-core movie fans, it is often enormous fun – there's a certain relief when it stops and we're popped back out to our banal, one-track lives."

USA Today gave the film three out of four stars, recommending it for its "humor and talented cast".

Retrospective reviews
In 2016, Lawrence Garcia wrote in an essay for Mubi that the film’s amateurish filming techniques were precisely Soderbergh’s point, saying Full Frontal "is a film about aesthetics, or more specifically the phoniness of it; that is, it’s concerned mainly with the gulf between an object, its presentation, and interpretation, with the L.A. lifestyle (which includes a neighbor that perpetually wears a Dracula costume) providing the perfect backdrop." Garcia did say the film’s "major flaw is that while individual scenes are often amusing, the film as a whole never quite coheres."

For the 20th anniversary of the film, writer Craig J. Clark noted "the parallels between [the behavior of the character Gus]…and the accusations leveled at executive producer Harvey Weinstein, one of the handful of sexual predators ensnared by the #MeToo movement whose punishment appears to be sticking. What makes the film especially curious as a cultural artifact is Gus is not its only Weinstein stand-in", referring to Garlin’s character, as well.

References

External links
 
 Full Frontal at Rotten Tomatoes
 Full Frontal at Box Office Mojo

2002 films
Films directed by Steven Soderbergh
American comedy-drama films
2002 comedy-drama films
2002 independent films
Self-reflexive films
Films set in Los Angeles
Films about filmmaking
Films about actors
Films about Hollywood, Los Angeles
Films produced by Gregory Jacobs
2000s English-language films
2000s American films
Miramax films